Rahimabad (also Romanized as Raḩīmābād) is a village in Rezqabad Rural District, in the Central District of Esfarayen County, North Khorasan Province, Iran. At the 2006 census, its population was 126, in 30 families.

References 

Populated places in Esfarayen County